The Brule River is a river of the U.S. state of Minnesota. A major tributary is the South Brule River, which rises at the east end of Brule Lake in the Boundary Waters Canoe Area Wilderness

Brule River is a name derived from the French meaning "burnt".

Half of the river disappears into a pothole known as "the Devil's Kettle" in Judge C. R. Magney State Park.  Studies in 2017 showed that the water comes up at the bottom of the river near the kettle.

See also
List of rivers of Minnesota
List of longest streams of Minnesota

References

Further reading
Minnesota Watersheds
USGS Hydrologic Unit Map - State of Minnesota (1974)

Rivers of Minnesota
Tributaries of Lake Superior
Rivers of Cook County, Minnesota
Northern Minnesota trout streams